Kevin Jason Dennis (born 14 December 1976) is an English retired professional footballer who played as a left winger in the Football League for Brentford.

Career

Brentford 
Dennis began his career in the academy at Premier League club Arsenal, before being released and signing a three-month contract with Second Division club Brentford during the 1996 off-season. He made the first senior appearance of his career as a 75th-minute substitute for Carl Asaba in a 2–0 defeat to Crewe Alexandra on 12 October 1996. Dennis broke into the team during the latter part of the 1996–97 season and made one appearance in the Bees' unsuccessful play-off campaign. He made just six appearances during 1997–98 and after the club's relegation to the Third Division at the end of the season, he signed a new one-year contract. Dennis was an unused substitute on one occasion during the 1998–99 season and was released in May 1999. Dennis made 21 appearances and scored no goals during three seasons at Griffin Park.

Non-League football 
During the 1998–99 season, Dennis spent time on loan from Brentford at non-League clubs Chesham United and Welling United. In 1999, he briefly joined Isthmian League Premier Division club Hampton & Richmond Borough on a free transfer and then returned to Conference club Welling United, for whom he played until December 1999.

Personal life 
In February 1994, Dennis was convicted of manslaughter together with his brother, the duo having stabbed 23-year-old Simon Geary to death in the Highbury neighbourhood. In 2001, he was found guilty of the 1999 murder of 23-year-old Batatunde Oba in a fight at an Ealing nightspot.

Career statistics

References

External links 

 

1976 births
Living people
English footballers
Footballers from Islington (district)
Association football wingers
Arsenal F.C. players
Brentford F.C. players
Chesham United F.C. players
Welling United F.C. players
Hampton & Richmond Borough F.C. players
English Football League players
Isthmian League players
National League (English football) players
English people convicted of murder
English people convicted of manslaughter